Sutterby is a hamlet in the East Lindsey district of Lincolnshire, England. Sutterby is in the civil parish of Langton by Spilsby.

The first recorded mention of Sutterby is in the Domesday Book; the "-by" at the end of its name indicates this place may originally have been a Viking settlement (the village is located within the area of the Danelaw).

In 1219 Hugh of Wells, bishop of Lincoln, granted the church at Sutterby to the Benedictine Nuns of the Priory of Chester. It seems that the nuns had lost it, however, by the time of the Dissolution of the Monasteries. The Church of John the Baptist, is a Grade II listed building under the protection of the Friends of Friendless Churches.

References

External links

"Sutterby St John the Baptist"; Friends of Friendless Churches. Retrieved 12 June 2012
Spirit of Sutterby

Hamlets in Lincolnshire
East Lindsey District